Shrinagar is a village situated in Porbandar Taluka of Porbandar District, Gujarat State in India. It is located 14.22 km from Porbandar.

Shrinagar was once the Capital of Jethwa dynasty ( who later ruled from Porbandar ), in 1220 AD when Rana Shri Shiyaji transferred the capital from Shrinagar to Ghumli.

References

Villages in Porbandar district
Former capital cities in India